Peter Eigen (born June 11, 1938, in Augsburg, Germany) is a lawyer, development economist and civil society leader.

Over a period of 12 years, Eigen founded and chaired Transparency International (TI), a non-governmental organization with National Chapters in over 100 countries. Founded in 1993, TI promotes transparency and accountability in government, business and international development.

Early life and education 
The third of four children, Peter Eigen was born on 11 June 1938 in Augsburg, Germany, of Grete Eigen (born Müchler) and Fritz Eigen, an engineer by training and industry manager. Eigen spent his early childhood during the war in Berlin and in Czechoslovakia where his father had been assigned by the Nazi regime to manage a large factory.  The family moved back to Germany after the war and settled in 1945 with his grandparents in Mettmann, and as of 1952 in Erlangen, Bavaria.  He studied law in Erlangen and Frankfurt/ Main and earned in 1964 a Doctor of Laws (Dr. iur.) at the Goethe Universität Frankfurt after having studied 1962–1963 at the University of Kansas, USA, as a scholar of the Fulbright Program. His time on the American continent, was the opportunity for a four-month life-changing road-trip through Latin America where he developed his awareness for social injustice and human rights.

Career

Early career
After his second law exam (Assessor Exam) in 1966, Eigen moved with his family to Washington DC where he taught international business law at the Georgetown University Law School and researched US and international anti-trust law for a professorial dissertation at Prof. Heinrich Kronstein's Institute for International and foreign Trade law, Georgetown and Frankfurt Universities.

In 1967 Eigen was offered a position at the Legal Department of the  World Bank. He interrupted his academic research and entered into the economic development field dealing with the legal aspects of development programs in Africa, Asia and Latin America. In 1971 he took a two-year leave to provide under Ford Foundation sponsorship for legal and technical assistance to the government of Botswana focusing on natural resources development. His wife, Jutta Eigen, worked as medical doctor in the National Hospital of Gaborone, Botswana.

After his return in 1974 to the World Bank, Eigen became manager of programs in Africa and Latin America, from 1983 Programs Division Chief for Argentina, Chile, Peru, Ecuador, Paraguay and Uruguay, and from 1988 to 1991 moved as Director of the Regional Mission for Eastern Africa of the World Bank, to Nairobi, Kenya.

Over the years at the World Bank, Eigen realised how much his work was being dwarfed by the devastating effects of corruption, which in fact he found to be the main obstacle to economic, social and democratic development. Further compelled by the recurring robust breakfast discussions with his wife Jutta, who had been providing medical care to the poorest in Kenyan slums, Eigen started considering the tackling of corruption as a vital goal of his work at the World Bank.

He began to mobilise like-minded executive colleagues as well as other experts, development leaders, diplomats and business bosses including development economist Laurence Cockcroft, GTZ Head Hansjörg Elshorst, Kenyan Businessman Joe Githongo, Bangladesh Finance Minister Kamal Hossain, World Bank Communications Director Frank Vogl and others.  Eigen was however soon ordered by his headquarters not to further pursue these efforts, even during his private spare time. The Bank's policy was indeed to regard corruption as part of the internal political and cultural affairs of the respective countries and under its Charter the Bank was not to interfere.

Frustrated, Eigen left the World Bank to spearhead his own anti-corruption efforts from Berlin.

Founding and Building Transparency International (TI)
After leaving the World Bank Eigen pursued actively the idea of creating a civil society organisation to fight corruption, mainly as it was driven by western companies systematically into the poorest countries in the developing world. Since most developed country governments condoned the active bribery by their citizens outside their borders, his efforts were met widely dismissed as naïve and even with hostility – including in Germany.

However, his endeavours were supported by some enlightened organisations like the German Corporation for International Cooperation  GTZ, the European Economic Community and the Global Coalition for Africa who invited him to present the anti-corruption case to numerous conferences in Africa, Asia and Latin America. The Ford Foundation funded him again for a legal assistance assignment for the government in Namibia in 1991. Gradually a consensus developed that a corruption-free world would be in the interest of most.

In the meantime, Eigen and his wife Jutta had moved to Berlin, the capital of the newly reunited Germany.  Out of their kitchen, Eigen continued to marshal friends and other supporters to found an organisation to tackle corruption, originally to be called “Business Practice Monitor (BPM)”. This reflected the frequent claims of western business promoters that they were forced by corrupt elites in developing countries to bribes; the idea was to counter this extortion by collective refusal to bribe. Only after numerous workshops and conferences a concept emerged in the development community and among civil society that recognised the key responsibility of business for bribing decision makers in often fragile countries.

This led over time to the concept of Transparency International (TI). In February1993 Eigen gathered some 20 inspired like-minded and experts from around the world in the Hague Netherlands where they signed the Founding Charter of Transparency International in the office of the Dutch Development Minister Jan Pronk in front of a German Notary, for it to become a charitable society based in Berlin. In May of the same year Eigen had managed to secure funding from the GTZ and the German Development Foundation (Deutsche Stiftung für Internationale Entwicklung (DSE))  to publicly launch TI in the Villa Borsig, the official Guest House of the Government in Berlin-Tegel, having mobilised for that occasion numerous leaders from Africa, Asia and Latin America as well as the German development community establishment. Transparency International's mission quickly widened to tackling corruption in all its forms by engaging civil society, business and government, a strategy designed by Eigen and which he designates as ‘the magic triangle’.

Drawing from Eigen's wide global network, the organisation soon developed a strong footing and legitimacy at the national level, spanning a network of National Chapters on all continents, as of  January 2021 in over 100 countries worldwide.  Eigen later celebrated that the change of the World Bank's policy as of 1996 under President Jim Wolfensohn, requiring borrowing countries to address the “cancer” of corruption, constituted a sea-change in the development community and eased considerably the assertion of a strong civil society voice on governance issues in numerous countries.  

Chairing the Board of Directors until 2005, Eigen used his network, experience and growing global fame as a champion for Transparency International to facilitate spectacular milestone achievements in the global fight against corruption. For example, institutionally, Eigen managed early on the tour de force to enlist endorsement for his young NGO by the most prominent global leaders as with former US President Jimmy Carter and German President Richard von Weizsäcker both became members of TI's Advisory Council among others such as Bangladesh Minister Kamal Hossain. Furthermore, very practically, Eigen was able to convene strategic high-powered meetings to bring about global policy change, as in 1996/7 at the Aspen Institute in Berlin with major German business leaders (chaired by the former German President Richard von Weizsäcker) to win their support for the participation of the Kohl-Government to the OECD anti-bribery convention. As Eigen likes to explain, this saw rich countries criminalising overseas corruption which they used to practically sponsor by allowing the deduction of foreign bribery as another business expense. This was a decisive threshold for many other governments and organisations to join the fight against corruption.  Eigen strongly advocated at TI for a philosophy of constructive engagement with politicians and the private sector while pressing them to stop engaging in corruption. This conciliating approach earned him soon a standing invitation at the World Economic Forum in Davos, where he represented TI and was the first civil society leader participating as such. Eigen in turn advocated for WEF to open their doors wider to NGOs, paying the way for Amnesty International, Greenpeace or Save the Children to participate.  His repeated interventions there also convinced WEF to develop anti-corruption guidelines for its business members: the WEF Partnering Against Corruption Initiative (PACI).

A further instance of his ability to win over new champions for TI's cause, Eigen won the support of retired Global Managing Partner of PricewaterhouseCoopers Jermyn Brooks, who then dedicated pro bono much of his time to TI and among others spearheaded the adoption of the Wolfsberg Anti-Money Laundering Principles, led TI's work towards the private sector and developed TI's Business Principles for Countering Bribery on which PACI was later modelled.

Acknowledging Peter Eigen's vision and tenacity, United Nations Secretary General Kofi Annan ironically dubbed the 10th (anti-corruption) Principle of the UN Global Compact ‘the Peter Principle’. Had it not been for Eigen's convincing work at the highest level, the Compact would count only 9 principles.

Having conceptualised TI, driven its formation before its incorporation and then chaired its Board for its first twelve years, Eigen decided in 2005 to step down from that role. He was appointed chairman of the organisation's Advisory Council.

Leadership with other initiatives
By the late 1990s, Eigen knew the World Bank had the political will and funds to support the fight against corruption, but he also understood it was ill-equipped to finance civil society around the world. With other experts, Eigen therefore established in 2000 the Partnership for Transparency Fund, a charitable company under US law able to receive World Bank funding and aimed at promoting good governance worldwide by securing funds and technical assistance for civil society organisations constructively engaging with governments.

Recognising the need for strengthening the role of civil society organisations, by empowering and training their leaders, exchanging ideas about their challenges and best practice, Peter Eigen initiated the founding of the Berlin Civil Society Centre (now International Civil Society Centre), winning Burkhard Gnärig, former CEO of International Save the Children Alliance (London), to help him set it up and lead the centre as its managing director until 2018, while working pro bono in the early years.

From 2007 to 2017 Eigen was a member of former UN Secretary General Kofi Annan-led Africa Progress Panel (APP), a group of ten distinguished individuals who advocated at the highest levels for equitable and sustainable development in Africa. As a Panel Member he facilitated coalition-building to leverage and broker knowledge and convened decision-makers to influence policy for lasting change in Africa. In 2018 he joined former Nigerian President Olusegun Obasanjo as co-chair of its successor organization, the Africa Progress Group.

Building up on his principle of the ‘magic triangle’ for a mutually beneficial partnership between civil society, private sector and government, Eigen chaired in 2005 the International Advisory Group founding the Extractive Industries Transparency Initiative (EITI), and chaired its board from 2006 to 2011. This multi-stakeholder Initiative established global standards for the good governance of oil, gas and mineral resources, whereby all three sectors are formally represented with equal voting power as constituting members of the initiative.

In the same vein, Eigen founded in Mauritania the Fisheries Transparency Initiative (FiTI), a global multi-stakeholder initiative that seeks to increase transparency and participation for the benefit of a more sustainable management of marine fisheries. He served as Chair of FiTI until October 2019, when the secretariat moved from Berlin to the Seychelles.

Since 2014, Eigen has been a co-founder and shareholder of the Humboldt-Viadrana Governance Platform, a charitable company promoting democratic processes and thought-through governance strategies in Germany, Europe and worldwide.

Teaching and Other Work
In 1979/80 Eigen taught as guest professor at Johann Wolfgang Goethe Universität, Frankfurt/M,  for the winter semesters of 1999 and 2000 at Harvard University, and in 2001 at Johns Hopkins School of Advanced International Studies (SAIS). In 2002, he was awarded the title of Honorary Professor of Political Science at the Freie Universität, Berlin and has been teaching there since.

In September 2001, Eigen joined the Carnegie Endowment for International Peace as Visiting Scholar. In 2004 he joined the advisory board of the Columbia Center on Sustainable Investment (CCSI), New York and the Board of the Center for International Environmental Law (CIEL), Washington.

Personal life
In 1963 Peter Eigen married Dr. Jutta Philippi, a physician and musician, with whom they had three children: Johanna, Christian and Tobias, who live with their families in the USA.  Mrs. Jutta Eigen passed away in 2002.

In 2004 Eigen married Gesine Schwan, the social–democrat candidate for the federal presidential elections in Germany in 2004 and 2009.

Eigen is an accomplished horse-rider, winning a number riding events in dressage and jumping. He founded a student riding club in Erlangen, and led the German student horse-riding union (Deutsche Akademische Reiterverband - DAR) during his studies. He is also passionate clarinet and saxophone player and opened with his Band a Jazz-.and Literary-Club in Erlangen which still exists under the name “Strohalm”.

Publications 
Most notable publications include

Books 

 Korruption im internationalen Geschäftsverkehr: Bestandsaufnahme, Bekämpfung, Prävention / Luchterhand / Neuwied, Kriftel / Vol.: ? / 1999. P: I-XXVI; 1–735. / Ed.: M. Pieth, P. Eigen / Language: German. Collection: TI ANTI.PREV (a+b)
 Das Netz der Korruption  2003,  Campus Verlag Frankfurt/ New York (Übersetzungen: The Net of Corrution; English, Spanish, et al.)

Book Sections 

 P. Eigen / The “moral relativity” of corruption / In: Leadership for Africa: In Honor of Olusegun Obasanjo on the Occasion of his 60th Birthday / African Leadership Foundation / New York / Vol.: n.a. / 1995. P: 205–214. / Language: English. Notes: Including contributions by Peter Eigen of Transparency International (The "moral relativity" of corruption) and Jeremy Pope of Transparency International (Images of a Nigerian in apartheid South Africa). Collection: TI POL.GOV
 P. Eigen / Bündnispartner im Kampf gegen internationale Korruption / In: Korruption in Deutschland: Ursachen, Erscheinungsformen, Bekämpfungsstrategien / Friedrich-Ebert Stiftung / Berlin / 1995. P: 63–69. / Language: German. Collection: TI COR.CST.GER; FG*
 P. Eigen, Christian Eigen-Zucchi / Corruption and Global Public Goods / In: Providing Global Public Goods: Managing Globalization / Inge Kaul, Pedro Conceicao, Katell Le Goulven, (Ed.) / UNDP; Oxford University Press / 2002  P: ? (1-30). /
 P. Eigen / Organized Civil Society Helps Better Global Governance/ In Festschrift honouring Nana Dr. SKB Asante, 2015

References

1938 births
Living people
Jurists from Bavaria
Harvard Kennedy School faculty
People from Augsburg